Carpelimus bilineatus is a species of spiny-legged rove beetle in the family Staphylinidae. It is found in Africa, Australia, Europe and Northern Asia (excluding China), North America, and South America. It was first described by James Francis Stephens in 1934.

References

Further reading

 

Oxytelinae
Articles created by Qbugbot
Beetles described in 1834
Taxa named by James Francis Stephens